The Art Institute of Cincinnati, also known as AIC College of Design, was a private for-profit art school in Cincinnati, Ohio. It was accredited by the Accrediting Commission of Career Schools & Colleges of Technology (ACCSCT).   It was founded as the ACA or the Academy of Creative Arts, and it offered an associate degree of Graphic Design and a three-year bachelor's degree of Graphic Design. The institution closed in 2019.

External links
Official website

Art schools in Ohio
Arts in Cincinnati
Universities and colleges in Cincinnati
Educational institutions established in 1976
1976 establishments in Ohio
2019 disestablishments in Ohio
Educational institutions disestablished in 2019